Holobus is a genus of beetles belonging to the family Staphylinidae.

The species of this genus are found in Europe, Southern Africa and America.

Selected species
 Holobus abruptus (Casey, 1911)
 Holobus albidicornis (Bernhauer, 1923)
 Holobus flavicornis (Lacordaire, 1835)

References

Staphylinidae
Staphylinidae genera